Julia Niewiadomska (born 11 February 2002) is a Polish handballer for SV Union Halle-Neustadt and the Polish national team.

She participated at the 2021 World Women's Handball Championship in Spain, placing 15th.

References

External links

2002 births
Living people
People from Warsaw
Polish female handball players
21st-century Polish women